Chommanee Sor Taehiran (born ) is a Thai female Muay Thai kickboxer and mixed martial artist who competes in the featherweight division in kickboxing and the flyweight division in MMA.

Kickboxing career
She has competed professionally since 2013 and has competed for the World Muaythai Council title against Caley Reece.
 In 2015 Chommanee Sor Taehiran won the first World Muay Thai Angels tournament. During 2015 she also won the Kings Cup Tournament. In 2018 she signed a multi-fight deal with Glory Kickboxing.

Championships and accomplishments

Muay Thai
World Muaythai Council
WMC Women's World Featherweight (-57.1 kg/126 lb) Championship (one time)
Regional Tournaments
2014 King Cup Tournament Winner (-57 kg/125.6 lb)
2014 World Muay Thai Angels Tournament Champion (-57 kg/125.6 lb)
2017 World Muay Thai Angels Tournament Runner-up (-57 kg/125.6 lb)

Fight record

Mixed martial arts record

|-
| Loss
| align=center| 0-1
| Anastasia Yankova
| Submission (Armbar)
| EFN - Fight Nights Petersburg
| 
| align=center| 1
| align=center| 2:31
| Saint Petersburg, Russia
|

References

External links
 Chommanee Sor Taehiran at Awakening fighters

1994 births
Living people
Chommanee Sor Taehiran
Chommanee Sor Taehiran
Flyweight mixed martial artists
Featherweight kickboxers
Mixed martial artists utilizing Muay Thai
Glory kickboxers
Chommanee Sor Taehiran